Fahrenheit is a temperature scale named after the physicist Daniel Gabriel Fahrenheit.

Fahrenheit may also refer to:

Entertainment

Music
 Fahrenheit (Toto album)
 Fahrenheit (Fahrenheit album)
 Fahrenheit (Chilean band), a hard rock band
 Fahrenheit (Taiwanese band), a Taiwanese boy band
 Fahrenheit (Thai band), a Thai rock band
 7800° Fahrenheit, an album by Bon Jovi
 "Fahrenheit", a song by Joe McElderry from Wide Awake
 "Falling Like the Fahrenheit", a song by Kamelot from their 2012 album Silverthorn

Video games
 Fahrenheit (1995 video game)
 Fahrenheit (2005 video game), also known as Indigo Prophecy in North America

Other uses
 Fahrenheit (crater)
 Fahrenheit (graphics API), computer software
 Fahrenheit (fanzine)
 Fahrenheit (magazine)
 Fahrenheit (perfume), a perfume made by Christian Dior
 Fahrenheit (roller coaster), at Hersheypark
 Fahrenheit 451, a novel by Ray Bradbury
 Fahrenheit 451 (1966 film), Francois Truffaut's film adaptation of the novel
 Fahrenheit 9/11, a 2004 movie by Michael Moore
 Fahrenheit 11/9, a 2018 movie by Michael Moore

See also
 Fahrenheit 451 (disambiguation)

German-language surnames